The Pedion was a subnotebook computer developed by Mitsubishi Electric with Hewlett-Packard in 1998. The notebook included a Pentium 233 MMX processor, 64 MB RAM, and a 1 GB Hard disk. 

The Greek word, pedion (πεδίον) means "plain", "flat", "field".

Mitsubishi ceased production and withdrew the notebook from the market due to "mechanical problems".

References

Mitsubishi Electric products, services and standards
Subnotebooks